The Midwest Social Forum (MWSF) is an annual gathering that creates a space for grassroots organizations, community activists, educators, students, and others committed to social justice to come together to exchange experiences and information, strengthen alliances and networks, and devise strategies for progressive social, economic, and political change. 

The MWSF builds on both regional and global traditions and sources of inspiration. It has its origins in the Midwest Radical Scholars and Activists Conference, which was founded in 1983 by the Havens Center at the University of Wisconsin–Madison and later renamed RadFest in the late 1990s. In 2003, the title Midwest Social Forum was added, inspired by the World Social Forum and the similar principles on which it was established, most importantly its commitment to diversity, democracy, and politically non-sectarian dialogue and deliberation, and to making a better, more just world possible (see WSF Charter of Principles here). Reflecting its growing identification and connection with the broader Social Forum movement, in September 2005, the MWSF organizing committee decided to drop the name RadFest and go solely by the title Midwest Social Forum. 

The Midwest Social Forum organizing committee is composed of individuals from a variety of Midwest-based social justice, grassroots, community, alternative media, and educational organizations and institutions who are committed to social justice movement building locally, nationally, and globally and who themselves reflect the diversity objectives of the Forum. The majority of the committee has also been actively involved in the MWSF previously and/or is knowledgeable of and experienced with the broader Social Forum movement (including the WSF and the USSF). 

The expansion of the MWSF is illustrative of the growth of the Social Forum movement more generally, which has spread to the regional, national, and even local level in many parts of the world. The World Social Forum itself has increased from 20,000 participants in 2001 to 155,000 in 2005. The first Social Forum of the Americas was held in Quito, Ecuador in July, 2004, the second in conjunction with one of the three realizations of the 2006 World Social Forum in Caracas, Venezuela in January 2006.  In 2007, the first United States Social Forum was held in Atlanta, Georgia.  Midwest Social Forum 2006 was held July 6-9, at the University of Wisconsin–Milwaukee.

See also 
 World Social Forum
 European Social Forum
 Southern Africa Social Forum
 Boston Social Forum

External links 
 Midwest Social Forum website

Articles about past Midwest Social Forums 

 Marc Becker on RadFest/Midwest Social Forum 2005
 Media Mouse reports on 2006 Midwest Social Forum

Links to other Social Forums 

 World Social Forum website
 Social Forum of the Americas 
 US Social Forum 
 Boston Social Forum 

Social forums